Ivaylo Danchev Pavlov (born 31 March 1984 in Vratsa) is a Bulgarian football player, who plays as a forward.

References

Living people
1984 births
Bulgarian footballers
Association football forwards
PFC Dobrudzha Dobrich players
FC Botev Vratsa players
First Professional Football League (Bulgaria) players
People from Vratsa